Lennart Nierenburg (born 15 May 1927) is a retired Swedish ice hockey player. Nierenburg was part of the Djurgården Swedish champions' team of 1950.

References

Swedish ice hockey players
Djurgårdens IF Hockey players
1927 births
Living people